Caitlin Sanchez is an American actress, best known for being the second voice of the title character Dora in the Nickelodeon animated children's series Dora the Explorer.

Career
In 2008, Sanchez took over the voice role of the seven-year-old lead character in Dora the Explorer, following the departure of the character's original voice actor Kathleen Herles that year when she went to college. She was selected from among 600 girls who auditioned for the part. She voiced the character until 2012, when Fátima Ptacek took over the role.

Besides appearing in several national commercials, Sanchez's other TV work includes as Lupe Rojas in an episode of Law & Order: SVU, ("Uncle" 2006) and appearing as Celia, the daughter of Carlos Ponce's character, on Lipstick Jungle. Her film work includes appearing in the film Phoebe in Wonderland.

Sanchez performed the National Anthem at an NBA game at the IZOD Center on November 21, 2009.

Filmography
 2006: Law & Order: Special Victims Unit – Lupe Rojas (1 episode)
 2008: Dora the Explorer – Dora (TV series; 2008–2012)
 2008: Phoebe in Wonderland – Monica
 2008: Lipstick Jungle – Celia Vega
 2008: Dora Saves the Snow Princess – Dora
 2009: Dora Saves the Crystal Kingdom – Dora
 2009: Dora's Christmas Carol Adventure – Dora
 2011: Dora's Ballet Adventure – Dora
 2011: Dora's Enchanted Forest Adventure – Dora
 2012: The Secret of Atlantis – Dora

Discography
 Dora's Party Favorites
 Dora's Christmas
 We Did It! Dora's Greatest Hits

Awards and nominations
 2009 40th NAACP Image Awards: Outstanding Performance in a Youth/Children's Program for Dora the Explorer
 2009 Imagen Awards: Best Actress/Television for Dora the Explorer
 2010 41st NAACP Image Awards: Outstanding Performance in a Youth/Children's Program for Dora the Explorer
 2010 Imagen Awards: Best Actress/Television for Dora the Explorer

References

External links

1996 births
Actresses from New Jersey
American child actresses
American people of Cuban descent
Hispanic and Latino American actresses
American television actresses
American voice actresses
Living people
People from Fairview, New Jersey
People from Englewood, New Jersey
21st-century American women